The Submarine Boys, by Victor G. Durham, is a series of adventure books for boys, published by Henry Altemus Company, Philadelphia, Pennsylvania, from 1909 through 1920. The series featured three sixteen-year-old boys and their underwater adventures.

Victor G. Durham was most likely a pen name, possibly of H. Irving Hancock. He is also referred to as "Lieutenant-commander Victor G. Durham"

Content 
Characters in the series include: David Pollard, an 'innovator'; Jacob Farnum, a shipbuilder; Jack Benson, the captain; and Hal Hastings, Eph Somers and Williamson, all crew.

Submarines in the series include the Pollard, the Farnum, the Benson, the Hastings, the Somers and the Spitfire.

Series titles 

1. The Submarine Boys on Duty; Life on a Diving Torpedo Boat, 1909
2. The Submarine Boys' Trial Trip; or,"Making good" as Young Experts, 1909
3. The Submarine Boys and the Middies; Or, The Prize Detail at Annapolis, 1909
4. The Submarine Boys and the Spies; Or, Dodging the Sharks of the Deep, 1910
5. The Submarine Boys' Lightning Cruise; Or, The Young Kings of the Deep, 1910
6. The Submarine Boys For the Flag; Or, Deeding Their Lives to Uncle Sam, 1910
7. The Submarine Boys and the Smugglers; Or, Breaking Up the New Jersey Customs Frauds, 1912
8. The Submarine Boys' Secret Mission; or, Beating an Ambassador's Game, 1920
''9. The Submarine Boys' Stern Chase (not published)

External links 
Submarine Boys Series at Henry Altemus Company

References 

Book series introduced in 1909
Series of books
Juvenile series